Coapilla is a town and one of the 123 Municipalities of Chiapas, in southern Mexico. It covers an area of 106.8 km²

As of 2010, the municipality had a total population of 8,444, up from 7,217 as of 2005.

As of 2010, the town of Coapilla had a population of 3,187. Other than the town of Coapilla, the municipality had 50 localities, the largest of which (with 2010 populations in parentheses) was: Buenavista (Matasanos) (1,198), classified as rural.

References

Municipalities of Chiapas